Mundre Ko Comedy Club was a Nepali stand-up comedy and talk show broadcast by Nepal Television. Hosted by Jeetu Nepal, first season of show had its premiere on 5 November 2018 and ended on 8 November 2021. It was one of the most viewed television programs in Nepal. Season 3 is expected to premier on 16 March 2023.

Format

Series overview

Mundre Ko Comedy Club featured Jeetu Nepal and his team of comedians, including Rajaram Poudel, Umesh Rai, Rajendra Nepali, Khadga Bahadur Pun Magar and Lekhmani Trital.  Deepa Shree Niraula was the permanent guest of the show but was replaced by Karishma Manandhar in season 2.

Cast

Main

Season 1

 Jitu Nepal as Host
Deepa Shree Niraula as permanent guest/Chairperson(अध्यक्ष ज्यू)
Rajaram Poudel as Landlord(घरबेटी अङ्कल)
Rajendra Nepali as Latte(लट्टे)
Umesh Rai as Phulandeki Aama(फुलन्देकी आमा)
Lunibha Tuladhar as Akbari(अकबरी)
Sandhya Budha as Kauli Budi(काउली बुडी)
Shivahari Bairagi as Jatte(जट्टे)

Season 2

 Jitu Nepal as Host
Karishma Manandhar as permanent guest/Chairperson(अध्यक्ष ज्यू)
Umesh Rai as Phulandeki Aama(फुलन्देकी आमा)
Khadga Bahadur Pun Magar as Khabapu
Lekhmani Trital as Ramesh Uncle ko chorro
Rajendra Nepali as Latte(लट्टे)

Season 1

Season 2

References

External links

2018 Nepalese television series debuts
Stand-up comedy television series
2010s television talk shows
Nepalese television talk shows